Michelle Dede is a Nigerian freelance television presenter and actress. She co-produced the film Flower Girl, starred in the television series Desperate Housewives Africa and the 2017 drama thriller What Lies Within.

Early life and education
Michelle Dede was born on 23 March in Germany, to the family of Brownson Dede, a Nigerian diplomat and former ambassador to Ethiopia. She had her early education in Brazil, her secondary and high school education was completed in Australia and Ethiopia respectively. She later proceeded to the United Kingdom to study Fashion Design and Marketing at the American College in London, the U.K. She also holds a post-graduate degree in Communications and P.R from the same institution.

Career
Her career started following a holiday in Nigeria. In 2006, alongside Olisa Adibua, she co-hosted the debut edition of Big Brother Nigeria, a Nigerian television series based on the Big Brother series. She later co-produced the 2013 film Flower Girl before she went on to star as Tari Gambadia in the TV series Desperate Housewives Africa. She cites Oprah Winfrey as her inspiration as a T.V host.
In 2017, Dede starred in the Nigerian drama thriller film What Lies Within with Paul Utomi, Kiki Omeili and Tope Tedela. In 2018 she starred in Moms at War.

Filmography
Flower Girl (2013)
Desperate Housewives Africa (2015)
What Lies Within (2017)
Moms at War (2018)
Eve (2019)
The Therapist (2021)

Personal life
Dede is a sister to comedian Najite Dede and brand ambassador for a beauty company, Emmaus Beauty.

Awards and nominations

References

External links

Living people
Nigerian television presenters
21st-century Nigerian actresses
Nigerian women television presenters
Nigerian film actresses
1984 births
Nigerian film producers